Bhura Hayal  بھورہ حیال a  fairly large village in Tehsil Kahuta with a population of about 15,000 +. It is located about 8 Kilometers from Chowk Pindori on Thoa Khalsa- Matore Road.

Origins
The name originates from "Hayal" family which settled here a long time ago. While "Bhura" is referred to a jungle in Pothowari language. It is not known with certainty, when exactly the area was inhabited, however Banyan trees with water ponds underneath, scattered around the adjoining small villages, suggest that it dates back to thousands of years before, perhaps to Buddha's time or even before. As regard the Muslim origin in this area, it is said that Muslim Army (Sultans or Mughals) probably fought a war here in some remote past. Graveyards of their Shuhada with distinctly different style of graves exist as of today at two to three different places near Bhura Hayal. At one place it is called "Shaheedan" (about 2 Kilometers from Bhura Hayal on road to Chowk Pindori). A similar graveyard exists at Bhata (a nearby village). A Mughal family lives in the Bhura Hayal which is believed to be settled here, since Mughal era. Another of their clan lives in nearby village, Mohra Hayal located near Chowk Pindori. Although people don't know the exact history, yet the proximity and alignment of these villages and above mentioned graveyards suggest some battle taking place in the direction of Kashmir from Punjab and meanwhile the settlement of invaders families. Prior to the creation of Pakistan, Hindu families also lived here and on their migration to India, vacuum was filled by the Muslim migrants from Shimla and later by some Kashmiri families.

Geography
Bhura Hayal has a very beautiful landscape. The towering minaret of Jamia Masjid (Farooqia), situated in the center of the village gives it an impressive look. On its northern side there are layers of Kahuta, Murree and Kashmir mountains of varying heights. Beautiful low-lying ridge line where in the recent past DHA Islamabad and Bahria Town have developed their housing scheme i.e. "DHA Valley" is just 4-5 Kilometers towards West. Occasionally, on a clear sky day one can see "Faisal Mosque", the main Jamia Mosque of Islamabad towards North West. The peak of Pir Panjal Range is also visible quite often early in the morning (prior to sunrise only, in the north-east direction). 
Kallar Syedan a major Potohar town lies on its South Eastern side. A ridge forms a crest line on its immediate East, shielding the view towards Thoa Khalsa. An interesting feature of this ridge line is that it is a watershed to two different rivers i.e. Indus and Jehlum. The water that flows towards East and south of this line goes into Jehlum River, while that flowing in the western and northern directions goes into River Indus. This watershed line then turns towards village Bhura Hayal itself. On a few houses on upper crest of the Bhura Hayal and Maira ( a small village located close by), this interesting phenomena can practically be observed where water from roof top goes to Indus River while that from the courtyard to the  River Jehlum (really interesting). Road passing through the village goes to Hajira and Rawalakot in Kashmir. Another road going to Kashmir through Kahuta joins in this road at Beor near River Jehlum. The average temperature  remains from 10 to 20 degrees Celsius in winter and from 25 to 38 degrees Celsius in Summer. The maximum spell of heat in summer is felt in June, July, August and up to the middle of September only, in all other months the weather remains pleasant. Sehora, Kaka, Rakh, Nullah, Karlahi, Dhaniam, Hallan, Dehri, Mandhar, Qibli, Pari, Aara, Dhok Peeple Wali are some other villages around. Sai, Kot, Bamlot, Mowara, Pamana, are slightly away.

Livelihoods
Farming is the main profession, however many prefer joining service sector, particularly Army. Area has produced many veteran soldiers who have proudly served in Pakistan as well as in British Army. Some participated in Burma campaign during Second World War. Wheat, barley, mustard, maze, peanuts and Indian pulses are some of the major crops grown here. There is a lot of potential for goat and cattle farming which however is not being fully utilized. People are cooperative, friendly and caring. They have preserved rich traditions of Potohar to a great extent. Potohari language with its original dialects and accent is spoken by locals, however English and Urdu language have significantly influenced and changed the dialect/ accent amongst educated people. The rich culture and traditions of the area are also changing due to media and other related developments.

References

https://web.archive.org/web/20121111082855/http://www.dhai.com.pk/dhavalley/
http://www.bahriatown.com/

Populated places in Rawalpindi District